The Circus of Carthage is a Roman circus in Carthage, in present-day Tunisia. Used for chariot racing, it was modeled on the Circus Maximus in Rome and other circus buildings throughout the Roman Empire. Measuring more than 470 m in length and 30 m in width, it could house up to 45,000 spectators, roughly one third of the Circus Maximus.

History

When exactly the Circus of Carthage was built is unknown, as it was used for several years before its official dedication. The building seems to have been constructing sometime around 238 AD. The people of the city of Carthage joined together in the circus to overcome the stresses of their lives. "Altogether, to go to the circus in a time of crisis was not to succumb to luxury but to show a robust, civic patriotism. To love one's city was to love the games. Salvian reports that as the Vandal armies closed in around the governmental capitals of Africa (439 AD) - first Cirta (Constantine, Algeria) in Numidia and then Carthage- they were met by "the sound of the people as they roared acclamations in the circus".

Circus of Carthage design

A brief description of the Circus of Carthage exists based on the mosaic found in Bardo National Museum in Tunis: "It is the only mosaic to show both the interior of the arena and the exterior façade, which has two arcades separated by a cornice. There also is an awning over the seats, which continue over the carceres, conveying more the appearance of an amphitheater than a circus. The two temple-like structures above the seating are novel, as well, and may be situated at the break and finish lines."

Building usage
The Circus of Carthage was Rome's second largest circus, one that rivaled the Circus Maximus.

The arena while smaller hosted many gamblers betting on the events there such as gladiatorial bouts and chariot races.

Building materials

Remains from the Circus Maximus, specifically the spina (a dividing barrier) was put into the Circus of Carthage, as well as the Circus of Maxentius and the city of Vienne located in France. These remains of the spina are marble.

See also

 Hippodrome – a Greek arena also used for chariot racing
 Carthage Punic Ports

References

238
Buildings and structures completed in the 3rd century
Carthage
Carthage